In the United States, the temperance movement, which sought to curb the consumption of alcohol, had a large influence on American politics and American society in the nineteenth and twentieth centuries, culminating in the prohibition of alcohol, through the Eighteenth Amendment to the United States Constitution, from 1920 to 1933.  There is some disagreement whether the policies were a 'failure' or whether they triggered an increase in organized crime, though that remains a commonly held belief. Several years after Prohibition policies were lifted, alcohol use remained significantly lower but eventually rose to pre-prohibition levels.  Crimes that were associated with excessive drinking such as domestic abuse also saw a sharp decline during Prohibition. Alcohol consumption is much lower than it was in early 1900's. (Sources on misunderstandings of Prohibition as failed policy: Courtwright, 2019; Owens, 2001, 2014; Livingston, 2015; Cooke, 2007, Zagorsky, 2020). Today, there are organizations that continue to promote the cause of temperance.   The World Health Organization has noted that out of social problems created by the harmful use of alcohol, "crime and violence related to alcohol consumption" are likely the most significant issue.

Early temperance: 1784–1861 

In the late eighteenth and early nineteenth century, various factors contributed to an epidemic of alcoholism that went hand-in-hand with spousal abuse, family neglect, and chronic unemployment. Americans who used to drink lightly alcoholic beverages, like cider "from the crack of dawn to the crack of dawn" began ingesting far more alcohol as they drank more of strong, cheap beverages like rum (in the colonial period) and whiskey (in the post-Revolutionary period). Popular pressure for cheap and plentiful alcohol led to relaxed ordinances on alcohol sales.

The temperance movement was born with Benjamin Rush's 1784 tract, An Inquiry Into the Effects of Ardent Spirits Upon the Human Body and Mind, which judged the excessive use of alcohol injurious to physical and psychological health. Influenced by Rush's Inquiry, about 200 farmers in a Connecticut community formed a temperance association in 1789 to ban the making of whiskey. Similar associations were formed in Virginia in 1800, and New York State in 1808. Over the next decade, other temperance organizations were formed in eight states, some being statewide organizations. The young movement allowed for temperate or moderate drinking.  Many leaders of the movement expanded their activities and took positions on observance of the Sabbath and other moral issues, and by the early 1820s political in-fighting had stalled the movement.

Some leaders persevered in pressing their cause forward. Americans such as Lyman Beecher, who was a Connecticut minister, had started to lecture his fellow citizens against all use of liquor in 1825. The American Temperance Society was formed in 1826 and benefited from a renewed interest in religion and morality. Within 12 years it claimed more than 8,000 local groups and over 1,250,000 members. By 1839, 18 temperance journals were being published. Simultaneously, some Protestant and Catholic church leaders were beginning to promote temperance. The movement split along two lines in the late 1830s: between moderates allowing some drinking and radicals demanding total abstinence, and between voluntarists relying on moral suasion alone and prohibitionists promoting laws to restrict or ban alcohol. Radicals and prohibitionists dominated many of the largest temperance organizations after the 1830s, and temperance eventually became synonymous with prohibition. In 1838, temperance activists pushed the Massachusetts legislature to pass a law restricting the sale of alcohol in quantities less than fifteen gallons. In the 1840s, numerous states passed laws allowing local voters to determine whether or not liquor licences would be issued in their towns or counties. In the 1850s, 13 states and territories passed statewide prohibitory laws (known as "Maine Laws"). Throughout this period, temperance reformers also tended to support Sunday laws that restricted the sale of alcohol on Sundays.

The Civil War dealt the movement a crippling blow. Temperance groups in the South were then weaker than their Northern counterparts and did not pass any statewide prohibition laws, and the few prohibition laws in the North were repealed by the war's end. Both sides in the war made alcohol sales a part of the war effort by taxing brewers and distillers to finance much of the conflict. The issue of slavery crowded out temperance and temperance groups petered out until they found new life in the 1870s.

Temperance theatre
Temperance birthed an entire genre of theatre. In 1825, a dramatic poem called The Forgers premiered at the Charleston Theatre in Charleston, South Carolina. The next significant temperance drama to debut was titled Fifteen Years of a Drunkard's Life, written by Douglas Jerrold in 1841. As the movement began to grow and prosper, these dramas became more popular among the general public. The Drunkard by W.H. Smith premiered in 1841 in Boston, running for 144 performances before being produced at Barnum's American Museum on lower Broadway. The play was wildly popular and is often credited with the entrance of the temperance narrative into mainstream American theatre. It continued to be a staple of New York's theatre scene all the way until 1875. The Drunkard follows the typical format of a temperance drama: the main character has an alcohol-induced downfall, and he restores his life from disarray once he denounces drinking for good at the play's end. Temperance drama continued to grow as a genre of theatre, fostered by the advent of the railroad as a form of transportation. This enabled theatre companies to be much more mobile, traveling from city to city. Temperance drama would even reach as far as the West Coast, as David Belasco's adaptation of Émile Zola's novel Drink premiered at the Baldwin Theatre in San Francisco in 1879. The image titled The Drunkard's Progress, shown in the top of the article, gives us a representation of the temperance movement. This image depicts the progress of a drunk man, slowly the woman disappears, and the man's night ends in death. This picture shows us that drinking is social but also brings poverty upon people, as well as death and loneliness.

Early victories in Maine
Maine was an early hotbed of the temperance movement. The world's first Total Abstinence Society was formed in Portland in 1815, and a statewide temperance group formed in 1834. These groups won a major victory in 1838 when they pressured the state legislature to pass the Fifteen Gallon Law, which prohibited the sale of spirits in quantities of less than that amount. Its practical effect was to make hard liquor available to the wealthy, who were the only ones who could afford such quantities. It was repealed within two years. However, in 1851 the so-called Maine law passed, which banned the production and sale of alcoholic beverages. Thus Maine became the first "dry" state. However, the law's exception for "medicinal, mechanical and manufacturing purposes" meant that liquor was still available for some.

Second Wave Temperance: 1872–1893 
As Reconstruction came to a close in the 1870s, many white reformers grew uninterested in racial equality and invested more energy into temperance. This period produced various temperance organizations including the prohibitionist Woman's Christian Temperance Union (WCTU, f. 1874) and the voluntarist Catholic Total Abstinence Union of America (CTAU, f. 1872). Prohibitionist temperance grew popular in the South as it embraced the "Southern" values of racial hierarchy, gender roles, and honor. The national movement enlisted more religious support throughout the country, especially from evangelicals.

Temperance education
In 1873, the WCTU established a Department of Scientific Temperance Instruction in Schools and Colleges, with Mary Hunt as National Superintendent. The WCTU was an influential organization with a membership of 120,000 by 1879. Frances Willard led the group under the motto "Do Everything" to protect women and children. Some of the changes the WCTU sought included property and custody rights for women, women's suffrage, raising the age of consensual sex, peace arbitration, women's education, and advocacy for working rights of women.

Because of the correlation between drinking and domestic violence—many drunken husbands abused family members—the temperance movement existed alongside various women's rights and other movements, including the Progressive movement, and often the same activists were involved in multiple movements. Many notable voices of the time, ranging from Lucy Webb Hayes to Susan B. Anthony, were active in temperance. In Canada, Nellie McClung was a longstanding advocate of temperance. As with most social movements, there was a gamut of activists running from violent (Carrie Nation) to mild (Neal S. Dow).

The American Temperance University opened in 1893 in the planned town of Harriman, Tennessee, which was developed as a community with no alcoholic beverages permitted. In its second year of operation the institution enrolled 345 students from 20 states. However, it closed in 1908.

Temperance fountains

Sickening and ill-tasting drinking water encouraged many Americans to drink alcohol for health purposes, so temperance groups constructed public drinking fountains throughout the United States following the Civil War. The National Woman's Christian Temperance Union (NWCTU)'s organizing convention of 1874 strongly encouraged its attendees to erect the fountains in the places that they had come from. The NWCTU advocated public temperance fountains as a means to discourage males from entering drinking establishment for refreshment.

Cast-stone statues of Hebe were marketed for use in temperance fountains. In Union Square Park (New York City) the James Fountain (1881), is a Temperance fountain with the figure of Charity who empties her jug of water, aided by a child; it was donated by Daniel Willis James and sculpted by Adolf Donndorf. In Washington DC "the" Temperance Fountain was donated to the city in 1882 by Temperance crusader Henry D. Cogswell. This fountain was one of a series of fountains he designed and commissioned in a belief that easy access to cool drinking water would keep people from consuming alcohol. Under its stone canopy the words "Faith," "Hope," "Charity," and "Temperance" are chiseled. Atop this canopy is a life-sized heron, and the centerpiece is a pair of entwined heraldic scaly dolphins. Originally, visitors were supposed to freely drink ice water flowing from the dolphins' snouts with a brass cup attached to the fountain and the overflow was collected by a trough for horses, but the city tired of having to replenish the ice in a reservoir underneath the base and disconnected the supply pipes. Other Cogswell fountains include one still standing in New York City's Tompkins Square Park.

Simon Benson, an Oregon lumberman, was a tee-totaler who wanted to discourage his workers from drinking alcohol in the middle of the day. In 1912, Benson gave the City of Portland USD$10,000 for the installation of twenty bronze drinking fountains. As of May 2012, these fountains, known as "Benson Bubblers", continue to be used as functional public drinking devices in downtown Portland; two Portland "Benson Bubbler" locations are Eastbank Esplanade and the corner of "3rd and Burnside".

Third wave temperance: 1893–1933 
The defeat of Mormon polygamy in 1890 left only one of the great moral causes of the 19th century unaddressed.  The last wave of temperance in the United States saw the rise of the Anti-Saloon League (ASL), which successfully pushed for National Prohibition from its enactment in 1920 to its repeal in 1933. This heavily prohibitionist wave attracted a diverse coalition: doctors, pastors, and eugenicists; Klansmen and liberal internationalists; business leaders and labor radicals; conservative evangelicals and liberal theologians.

Anti-Saloon League 
Rev. Howard Hyde Russell founded the Anti-Saloon League (ASL) in 1893. Under the leadership of Wayne Wheeler the ASL stressed political results and perfected the art of pressure politics. It did not demand that politicians change their drinking habits, only their votes in the legislature. Other organizations like the Prohibition Party and the WCTU soon lost influence to the better-organized and more focused ASL.

The ASL's motto was "the Church in action against the saloon," and it mobilized its religious coalition to pass state (and local) legislation (establishing dry states and dry counties).

By the late nineteenth century, most Protestant denominations and the American wing of the Catholic Church supported the movement to legally restrict the sale and consumption of alcoholic beverages. These groups believed that alcohol consumption led to corruption, prostitution, spousal abuse, and other criminal activities. Brewers and distillers resisted the reform movement, which threatened to ruin their livelihoods, and also feared women having the vote, because they expected women to vote for prohibition.

Energized by the anti-German sentiment during World War I, the ASL achieved its main goal of passage on December 18, 1917—the 18th Amendment. Upon ratification by three-fourths of the state legislatures by January 16, 1919, established National Prohibition. The Amendment took effect on January 16, 1920. Prohibition banned "the manufacture, sale, and transportation of alcoholic beverages in the United States and its possessions." However, Prohibition did not outlaw the private possession or consumption of alcohol products.

Modern temperance: Post-World War II 
Harvard Medical School professors Jack Harold Mendelson and Nancy K Mello write, with regard to temperance sentiment in contemporary America, that "rallying cries once structured in terms of social order, home and basic decency are now framed in terms of health promotion and disease prevention." Original temperance organizations such as the Woman's Christian Temperance Union and International Organization of Good Templars continue their work today, while new "temperance enterprises found support in a variety of institutional venues" such as the Marin Institute for the Prevention of Alcohol and Other Drug Problems and Center for Science in the Public Interest. These temperance organizations focus their efforts on "promoting increased taxation, reducing alcohol advertising, and monitoring of the beverage industry", as well as the supporting of Sunday blue laws, which prohibit the sale of alcohol on Sundays.

Temperance organizations
Temperance organizations of the United States played an essential role in bringing about ratification of the Eighteenth Amendment of the United States Constitution establishing national prohibition of alcohol. Some temperance organizations in the United States include:

 The American Issue Publishing House
 The American Temperance Society
 The Anti-Saloon League (active)
 The British Women's Temperance Association (active)
 The Catholic Total Abstinence Union of America
 The Center for Science in the Public Interest (active)
 The Committee of Fifty (1893)
 The Daughters of Temperance
 The Department of Scientific Temperance Instruction
 The Flying Squadron of America
 The IOGT-USA (active)
 The Knights of Father Matthew
 The Lincoln-Lee Legion
 The Marin Institute for the Prevention of Alcohol and Other Drug Problems (active)
 The Methodist Board of Temperance, Prohibition, and Public Morals
 The National Temperance Society and Publishing House
 The Pioneer Total Abstinence Association (active)
 The Prohibition Party (active)
 The Salvation Army (active)
 The Scientific Temperance Federation
 The Sons of Temperance (active)
 The Templars of Honor and Temperance (active)
 The Abstinence Society
 The Total Abstinence Society, formed in Portland, Maine in 1815.
 The Woman's Christian Temperance Union (active)
 The Woman's New York State Temperance Society, founded in 1852 by Susan B. Anthony and Mary C. Vaughn
 The National Temperance Council
 The World League Against Alcoholism (a pro-prohibition organization)

There was often considerable overlap in membership in these organizations, as well as in leadership. Prominent temperance leaders in the United States included Bishop James Cannon, Jr., James Black, Ernest Cherrington, Neal S. Dow, Mary Hunt, William E. Johnson (known as "Pussyfoot" Johnson), Carrie Nation, Howard Hyde Russell, John St. John, Billy Sunday, Father Mathew, Andrew Volstead and Wayne Wheeler.

There were also commercial establishments, such as the Glenwood Inn (Hornellsville, New York), that made a point of selling no alcohol so as to attract families.

See also

Anti-Cigarette League of America
Daisy Douglas Barr
Diocletian Lewis
Edith Smith Davis
Eliza Thompson
Frances E. L. Preston
Gene Amondson
Let Every Man Mind His Own Business (short story)
Mary Hunt
Native American temperance activists
Purley Baker
Straight Edge
The Hallelujah Trail
Temperance and Good Citizenship Day
Thomas Sewall
Washington movement

Notes and references

References
 Ernest Cherrington, Evolution of Prohibition in the United States (1926).  by dry leader
 Clark; Norman H. Deliver Us From Evil: An Interpretation of American Prohibition. W. W. Norton, 1976. supports prohibition
 Dannenbaum, Jed. "The Origins of Temperance Activism and Militancy among American Women", Journal of Social History vol. 14 (1981): 235–36.
 Gusfield, Joseph R. Symbolic Crusade: Status Politics and the American Temperance Movement. Urbana, IL: University of Illinois Press, 1963.
 Jensen, Richard. The Winning of the Midwest, Social and Political Conflict, 1888–1896. Chicago, IL: University of Chicago Press, 1971.
 McConnell, D. W. Temperance Movements. In: Seligman, Edwin R. A., and Johnson, Alvin (eds.) Encyclopedia of the Social Sciences, 1933.
 Meyer, Sabine N. We Are What We Drink: The Temperance Battle in Minnesota. Champaign, IL: University of Illinois Press, 2015.
 Odegard, Peter H. Pressure Politics: The Story of the Anti-Saloon League.  1928.
 Sheehan, Nancy M. The WCTU and education: Canadian-American illustrations. Journal of the Midwest History of Education Society, 1981, P, 115–133.
 Timberlake, James H. Prohibition and the Progressive Movement, 1900–1920. Cambridge, MA: Harvard University Press, 1963.
 Tracy, Sarah W. and Caroline Jean Acker; Altering American Consciousness: The History of Alcohol and Drug Use in the United States, 1800–2000. Amherst, MA: University of Massachusetts Press, 2004.
 Tyrrell, Ian; Woman's World/Woman's Empire: The Woman's Christian Temperance Union in International Perspective, 1880–1930. Chapel Hill, NC: University of North Carolina Press, 1991.
 Volk, Kyle G. Moral Minorities and the Making of American Democracy. New York: Oxford University Press, 2014.

External links
Woman's Christian Temperance Union (WCTU)
American Council on Addiction & Alcohol Problems, formerly the Anti-Saloon League
Alcohol Justice - The Marin Institute for the Prevention of Alcohol and Other Drug Problems
In the South  (entry in the New Georgia Encyclopedia)
Temperance news page – Alcohol and Drugs History Society
NBC News interview with CUNY's Josh Brown on the Temperance Movement
See more images from temperance movement in the United States by selecting the "Alcohol" subject at the Persuasive Cartography, The PJ Mode Collection, Cornell University Library

1784 establishments in the United States
History of the United States
United States
Prohibition in the United States
Social movements in the United States